Kim Chung-ha (born Kim Chan-mi []; February 9, 1996), known mononymously as Chungha (stylized as CHUNG HA), is a South Korean pop singer, dancer and choreographer signed under MNH Entertainment. She finished fourth in Mnet's girl group survival show Produce 101, becoming a member of the resulting girl group I.O.I. Following the dissolution of I.O.I in 2017, Chungha debuted as a solo artist with the extended play Hands on Me.

Early life
Chungha was born as Kim Chan-mi on February 9, 1996, in Seoul. Under her English name Annie Kim, she lived in Dallas, Texas, for eight years before returning to South Korea to become a singer. As a result, she speaks both English and Korean. She graduated from Sejong University, majoring in dance. She auditioned for YG Entertainment and was a JYP Entertainment trainee prior to joining MNH Entertainment. Kim trained for three years before debuting, and had been dancing for 6–7 years. She revealed that she almost quit attending dance classes at some point due to financial issues.

Career

2016–2017: Produce 101, I.O.I, and solo debut with Hands on Me

From January 22 to April 1, Kim represented MNH Entertainment on reality girl group survival show Produce 101. She finished in fourth place and debuted on May 4, with the project girl group I.O.I with the mini-album Chrysalis. On June 10, YMC Entertainment revealed Chungha as one of the seven members of the group's unit group, slated to promote their second single, "Whatta Man", during the summer of 2016. It was revealed that three teams were contacted to make the choreography for the single, but hers was chosen because it was deemed to be the highest quality. The single was a commercial success peaking at number 2 on the Gaon Digital Chart and on the Gaon Album Chart, for its digital (downloads and streaming) and physical sales respectively.

On June 30, it was revealed that Chungha would be having a cameo appearance on Korean drama, Entourage, along with groupmate Lim Na-young. On July 24, she was revealed to be a new cast member on dance survival show, Hit The Stage. On August 17, it was announced that Chungha would be collaborating with groupmates Choi Yoo-jung, Jeon So-mi, and DIA's Ki Hui-hyeon for the digital single, "Flower, Wind and You", which was produced by Boi B. The music video was released on MBK Entertainment's YouTube channel. On December 21, MNH Entertainment confirmed that she will be debuting as a solo artist in the beginning of 2017 after wrapping up I.O.I's promotions. On December 23, Chungha collaborated with Heo Jung-eun and HALO's Ooon for the holiday carol, "Snow in This Year", that was featured on the Korean drama, My Fair Lady.

On January 10, 2017, Chungha was selected to be a host for EBS' Ah! Sunday – A Running Miracle. Chungha would show the public how to improve their physical fitness via jogging and would take a team of challengers under her wing for the show. On April 21, she released her pre-debut single titled "Week", on the official M&H Entertainment YouTube account, followed on June 7 by her debut EP, entitled Hands on Me, with the lead track "Why Don't You Know". Chungha subsequently featured in Samuel Kim's solo debut album entitled Sixteen with the track "With U", and in Babylon's single, "La La La". From September 3 onwards, she took over Kisum as a DJ for EBS's radio program Listen, and on September 19, it was announced that she would be an MC for FashionN's Please Take Care of My Vanity alongside Super Junior's Leeteuk and Han Chae-young. On November 22, the first episode of her own reality show, Chungha's Free Month, was released on YouTube and NaverTV.

2018–2019: Offset, Blooming Blue, Gotta Go, and Flourishing

Chungha released her second extended play Offset on January 17, 2018. The EP contains five tracks including the title track "Roller Coaster". On June 26, MNH Entertainment confirmed that she would be having a comeback on July 18 with her third mini-album titled Blooming Blue, with "Love U" serving as the lead single. Chungha became the ambassador for the Seoul International Architecture Film Festival in October of the same year. It was announced on August 8 that she would join the project group consisting of Red Velvet's Seulgi, (G)I-dle's Soyeon and GFriend's SinB called Station Young for SM Entertainment's project album SM Station X 0. They released their single, "Wow Thing" on September 28. Chungha collaborated with Super Junior's Yesung with the song, "Whatcha Doin'", with the music video released on December 16.

On January 2, 2019, she released her single album, Gotta Go. On January 9, Chungha won her first-ever music program trophy on the MBC Music's Show Champion. She was featured in VIXX member Ravi's new single, "Live", which was released on February 18, 2019. Chungha released her fourth EP Flourishing on June 24, 2019, alongside the music video of the lead single, "Snapping". "Snapping" was placed first on Show Champion on July 3, 2019. In August, she joined the soundtrack lineup for the tvN drama Hotel del Luna. The track, titled "At the End", was released on August 3, 2019. Chungha collaborated with Grizzly on the single "Run", released on August 22, and with Mommy Son on the single "Fast", released in September for the JTBC Seoul Marathon. In October 2019, Chungha collaborated with Indonesian rapper Rich Brian on the single "These Nights". The track serves as the single for 88rising's second compilation album, Head in the Clouds II. Chungha was featured in rapper Changmo's "Remedy" for his album Boyhood, released on December 25, 2019. For her accomplishments in 2019, Chungha was awarded the Producer of the Year and Hot Performance Award of the Year with "Gotta Go" at the 2019 Gaon Chart Music Awards. On December 12, 2019, Billboard published their list of the "25 Best K-pop Songs of the 2019", with Chungha's single "Gotta Go" ranked at number three. Billboard described the latter as "Chungha fully embracing her stronger, more confident side; a side that's stayed consistent throughout her major year and can help guide her to even greater heights in the new decade". The single was also ranked hundredth on Billboard's "The 100 Greatest K-Pop Songs of the 2010s".

2020–present: Promotion in the United States, Querencia and Bare & Rare
In January 2020, Chungha collaborated with Paul Kim on the single "Loveship", which was released on January 21, 2020. She was part of the soundtrack lineup for the SBS drama Dr. Romantic 2 with the track "My Love", released on February 4, 2020. Chungha made her first comeback in 2020 with a new single, "Everybody Has" on February 29 as part of MNH Entertainment's New.wav project. On March 10, MNH Entertainment announced that Chungha had signed with American agency, ICM Partners, for her America and global promotions.

In April, Chungha collaborated on the pop song "Lie" with TVXQ singer Max Changmin. The song was featured on Changmin's debut extended play Chocolate and talks about the emotions exchanged between lovers who feel love in different intensities. On April 27, "Stay Tonight" was released as a pre-release single from the singer's upcoming album. The song debuted and peaked at number 9 on the Gaon Digital Chart, and peaked at number 4 on the Billboard World Digital Songs chart.

Chungha released the single "My Friend", which features ph-1 and produced by Zion.T on May 30, 2020. She then collaborated with Sprite on the promotional single "Be Yourself" on June 9, 2020. The single was also part of MNH's New.wav project. On July 6, Chungha released her second pre-released single, "Play". The maxi single which consists of the two pre-released singles, peaked at number 7 on the Gaon Album Chart with 12,613 sales. It was announced that Chungha would be a cast member in Law of the Jungle in Wild Korea, the first domestic filming in the programme history due to the COVID-19 pandemic.

Chungha made a soundtrack appearance for the tvN drama Record of Youth with the track "You're In My Soul", released on September 14, 2020. She then collaborated with Danish singer, Christopher on the single, "Bad Boy". The live version was released on September 23 while the music video was released on September 25. Chungha signed with 88rising in November 2020. She then collaborated with R3hab on the single "Dream of You" released on November 27, 2020.

On December 7, it was confirmed that Chungha had tested positive for COVID-19. All her activities were temporarily halted and she was in self-isolation. She also missed the live press conference for the new show "Running Girls", but made appearance as her parts were shown in the premiere. On December 21, it was confirmed that Chungha was an asymptomatic carrier, and had left quarantine after 10 days and is resting at home since December 18. Chungha was set to release her first full-length album Querencia on January 4, 2021, but the release of the album was  delayed to February 15, 2021. The title track "Bicycle" with the music video was released on the same day. Chungha was featured on Rain's "Why Don't We", which is the title track for his third EP Pieces by Rain. The EP and the music video was released on March 3, 2021. Chungha and the members of I.O.I celebrated their 5th debut anniversary with a reunion live stream show called "Yes, I love it!" on May 4, 2021.

On June 8, 2021, Chungha collaborated with Colde on the single "My Lips Like Warm Coffee". She then participated in the soundtrack of One the Woman with the single "Someday". In October 2021, Chungha made a special collaboration with the dance crew LACHICA on the single "Bad Girl" for the Street Woman Fighter Special.

On November 29, 2021, Chungha released the special single "Killing Me".

On July 11, 2022, Chungha released the first part of her second full-length album Bare & Rare with its lead single "Sparkling".

In January 2023, the agency confirmed that Chungha had decided not to renew her contract which will end in March.

Influences
Chungha has stated singer-songwriter IU is her role model as she admires the way the soloist is able to sing, dance, and perform various other things. She has also stated that soloists BoA and Lee Hyori, and girl group 2NE1 are some of her role models.

Endorsements and promotions
Chungha has endorsed various products ranging from electronics to clothing and cosmetics. Her first endorsement was for Nike's "Nike x W Korea", alongside singer Amber Liu and dancer May J Lee in 2017.

Chungha's endorsements includes modeling for Umbro, women's clothing brand Muzak Ifne, Lens Town's contact lenses, endorsing Lotte Liquor's 'Chungha', and being the brand model for Guljak Topokki Chicken restaurant. She has also endorsed the video games Sudden Attack and Bosslave, and LG Corporation's mobile service U+ 5G. In March 2019, Clinique announced that they had worked with and chosen Chungha as the brand's global ambassador. In May 2019, Sprite Korea announced her as the new model and face of the brand and their Summer 2019 Dive in Sprite Campaign alongside actor Jang Ki-yong.
In April 2020, Chungha officially joined the Dolce & Gabbana beauty family.

Philanthropy
On October 12, 2021, Chungha was announced as a member of the Green Noble Club. The club is made of large donors who've made donations of ₩100 million or more to the Green Umbrella Children's Foundation.

On February 9, 2023, Chungha donated ₩50 million to support low-income families' medical expenses on her 28th birthday through the Green Umbrella Children's Foundation.

Discography

Querencia (2021)
Bare & Rare (2022)

Filmography

Television series

Television shows

Radio shows

Awards and nominations

Notes

References

External links

 Chungha at MNH Entertainment 

1996 births
Living people
Spanish-language singers of South Korea
Singers from Seoul
South Korean female idols
South Korean women pop singers
21st-century South Korean singers
Swing Entertainment artists
South Korean dance musicians
Produce 101 contestants
I.O.I members
21st-century South Korean women singers
Sejong University alumni